La Molina is a ski resort in the Pyrenees mountains of northeastern Spain, in the municipality of Alp in the comarca of Cerdanya in Girona, Catalonia. Together with Masella, it forms the Alp 2500 resort.

It is the site of the first ski lift in Spain, opened on 28 February 1943, and Spain's first ski school, which opened a year later.

It is served by a RENFE / Rodalies train station.

Sport and recreation
The area hosted World Cup alpine races in December 2008 (women's technical events)
 and hosted the Snowboarding World Championships in January 2011. In 2013 the resort hosted the 2013 IPC Alpine Skiing World Championships. New facilities such as a new track with a lift in the area of Pla d'Anyella have been built.

On 23 March 2016 the resort was the finishing point for the third stage of the road cycling race the Volta a Catalunya, which was won by Dan Martin of Etixx–Quick-Step.

References

External links

 

Ski areas and resorts in Catalonia
Pyrenees